Oleksandr Bohdanovych Korpan (8 September 1994 – 2 March 2022) was a Ukrainian military pilot (captain) of the Ukrainian Air Force of the Armed Forces of Ukraine, participant in the Russo-Ukrainian war, the best strike aircraft pilot in 2021. He is Hero of Ukraine (2022).

Biography 

Korpan was born in Starokostiantyniv, Khmelnytskyi Oblast.

He served in the 299th Tactical Aviation Brigade named after General Vasily Nikoforov as commander of the aviation squadron of this brigade.

Korpan died on 2 March 2022 during a combat flight in the airspace over Starokostiantyniv.

He was buried on 7 March 2022 at the cemetery in Halych, Ternopil Oblast.

Awards 
 the title of Hero of Ukraine with the award of the Order of the Golden Star (2022, posthumously) — for personal courage and heroism shown in the defense of the state sovereignty and territorial integrity of Ukraine, loyalty to the military oath.
 commemorative badge of the Commander of the Air Force of the Armed Forces of Ukraine "Martial kill, honor, courage" (2016)
 honorary badge of the Commander-in-Chief of the Armed Forces of Ukraine "For achievements in military service".
 10 Years of Conscientious Service medal

References

External links 
president.gov.ua About conferring the title of Hero of Ukraine

1994 births
2022 deaths
Recipients of the Order of Gold Star (Ukraine)
Ukrainian military personnel killed in the 2022 Russian invasion of Ukraine
People from Starokostiantyniv